Chester Creek Historic District is a national historic district located along the west branch of Chester Creek at Thornbury Township, Delaware County, Pennsylvania.  The district includes 52 contributing buildings and 5 structures associated with the early settlement and industrial development of the Chester Creek valley. Notable buildings and structures include the Yarnall Bank House, Locksley Mill and Manor House (1704), John Edwards House, Glen Mills Station (1882), Station House and Store (c. 1882), Willcox Mills (c. 1850), Workers' Cottages (c. 1830-1880), Daniel Broomall House, and the Hemphill House.

It was added to the National Register of Historic Places in 1972.

References

Historic districts in Delaware County, Pennsylvania
Historic districts on the National Register of Historic Places in Pennsylvania
National Register of Historic Places in Delaware County, Pennsylvania